Donald Frederick McVicar (6 November 1962 – 31 January 2006) was a Scottish footballer who played as a left back.

Career
McVicar spent most of his career at St Johnstone and made a total of 263 appearances, scoring 12 goals in two spells with the club. A winner of the First Division championship with Saints in 1982–83, he had an even happier second spell at Perth. He played an integral role under Alex Totten to help the club gain promotion from the Second Division in 1987–88 and then captained the team to the First Division title again in 1989–90.

McVicar also played for Tranmere Rovers, Montrose, Partick Thistle, Airdrieonians, Ayr United, Forfar Athletic, Arbroath and Elgin City.

Death
McVicar died on 31 January 2006, aged 43, after a four-year battle with motor neuron disease. Geoff Brown, then St Johnstone chairman, said: "It is sad news to hear, obviously for his family and all Perth supporters.Don was highly thought of by fans because of his strong left-foot and the fact he tackled extremely hard. He was a supporters' type of player."

References

1962 births
2006 deaths
St Johnstone F.C. players
Scottish Football League players
Scottish footballers
Footballers from Perth, Scotland
Association football fullbacks
Tranmere Rovers F.C. players
English Football League players
Montrose F.C. players
Partick Thistle F.C. players
Airdrieonians F.C. (1878) players
Ayr United F.C. players
Forfar Athletic F.C. players
Arbroath F.C. players
Elgin City F.C. players
Neurological disease deaths in Scotland
Deaths from motor neuron disease